McKinley Hunt (born 5 January 1997) is a Canadian rugby union player. She plays Lock for Canada internationally and for Exeter Chiefs in the Premier 15s.

Hunt competed for Canada at the delayed 2021 Rugby World Cup in New Zealand. She scored a try against the Eagles in their quarterfinal encounter. She then featured in the semifinal against England, and in the third place final against France.

References

External links 

 McKinley Hunt at Canada Rugby

Living people
1997 births
Female rugby union players
Canadian female rugby union players
Canada women's international rugby union players